Doha International Airport  is an airport in Doha, Qatar. It was Qatar's commercial international airport until Hamad International Airport opened on 27 May 2014. While all scheduled commercial traffic ceased, the airport site and existing runway is still used by Qatar Emiri Air Force, Qatar Amiri Flight, Rizon Jet, Gulf Helicopters and Qatar Aeronautical College. It also acts as a state/diplomatic airport catering to both Qatar Amiri Flight (which is based at the airport) and state visit flights. The airport welcomed commercial flights again on 15 September 2022 for selected airlines to handle increased traffic for the 2022 FIFA World Cup that took place in the country in November.

History

The airport suffered from overutilization, even though it had been expanded numerous times. Before the opening of the new airport, the capacity stood at 12 million passengers per year. Its  runway was one of the longest at a civil airport. It was the main base of Qatar Airways. In the past, the airport was mostly used by Qatari holiday makers and foreign workers coming for the oil and gas sector. As Qatar Airways expanded rapidly, the airport grew and attracted more people such as holiday makers and transit travelers. In 2010, it was the world's 27th busiest airport by cargo traffic. The control tower and ancillary buildings were designed by Curtis W. Fentress, FAIA, RIBA of Fentress Architects.

All scheduled commercial air traffic serving this airport moved to the new Hamad International Airport on 27 May 2014. The old airport was [originally] planned to be demolished, but it has been refurbished and reopened for the 2022 FIFA World Cup.

Terminals

Departure and Transfer Terminal 
This was the main terminal at Doha and handled all economy class Qatar Airways flights, as well as all other airlines using the airport. This terminal was expanded several times in order to cope with the increasing number of passengers using the airport each year. The terminal had 44 satellite gates, as well as seating areas and a large duty-free area. There were 3 lounges in this terminal, including the Oryx Lounge, which was used by all foreign airlines' premium passengers, the Qatar Airways Gold Lounge, which was used by Qatar Airways Gold Privilege Club members, and the Qatar Airways Silver Lounge, used by Qatar Airways silver privilege club card holders. This terminal had been expanded as the old Arrivals Terminal was integrated into the departures terminal, while a new arrival terminal was opened. All departing and transferring passengers used this facility, as passengers arriving into Doha used the new Arrivals Terminal. The Departure and Transfer Terminal opened an additional 12 boarding positions located between the terminal and the Premium Terminal gates, as well as a revamped Oryx lounge to cater for the increase in passenger numbers.  The passenger facilities featured 60 check-in counters, 42 parking bays for aircraft and 15 baggage claim belts.

Terminal A
Terminal A of the Departure and Transfer Terminal was the check-in area used by the airport's biggest user, Qatar Airways, as well as Cathay Pacific, which operated a codeshare with Qatar Airways to Hong Kong under a strategic partnership agreement.

Terminal B
In June 2011, Terminal B, built on the location of the former arrivals terminal at Doha International Airport, was dedicated to more than 30 foreign airlines operating services from Doha. The terminal included an enlarged check-in area with 35 counters and a new baggage handling system, as well as food outlets. All foreign airlines were moved to Terminal B.

All terminals have been renovated recently and will be operational by the end 2021 or early to mid-2022 for the FIFA football World Cup that will be held in Qatar.

Arrivals Terminal 
On 19 December 2010, a new Arrival Terminal was opened in the western apron, in the site of the former Asian Games (which Doha hosted in 2006) temporary terminal. The terminal had a capacity of 2,770 passengers per hour. The  Arrivals Terminal replaced the arrivals hall of what became the Departure and Transfer Terminal. The Arrivals Terminal had 22 immigration counters, eight e-gates, eight baggage carousels, 36 concierge desks for hotel transfers, car rental and other services, as well as 746 parking spaces. The former arrivals hall was merged with the departing hall, adding extra valuable space and capacity to the airport. These changes were part of the multimillion-dollar expansion of Doha Airport to cope with the increasing traffic of Qatar Airways and other airlines before the new Hamad International Airport opened in 2014.

Qatar Airways Premium Terminal 
The Qatar Airways Premium Terminal was opened in 2006 and handled all Qatar Airways first and business class passengers. There are 6 gates in this terminal.

Airlines and destinations 

The airport shut down for commercial traffic on 27 May 2014 when all airlines relocated to its successor, Hamad International Airport. The last commercial flight departing from Doha International Airport was a Lufthansa plane returning to its home of Frankfurt at 00:30 on 28 May 2014.

From 14 September 2022, the airport has started again to be used for passenger traffic, due to the 2022 FIFA World Cup. At least 13 airlines, including Etihad Airways, Flydubai, Pegasus Airlines, Jazeera Airways, and SalamAir moved their regular scheduled flights to the airport, until the end of 2022, after the end of the World Cup. Designated Match Day Shuttle flights will instead use the newer Hamad International Airport. All shuttle flights operated to the airport has come to a halt as the world cup is done.

Statistics
Since 1998, the number of passengers and total cargo load increased significantly.

Accidents and incidents
On 13 March 1979, an Alia Royal Jordanian Boeing 727 operating Flight 600 crashed following a missed approach. Three crew members and 42 passengers were killed. The aircraft was written off.
In 2000, an Iraqi hijacker hijacked a Qatar Airways plane and demanded that the pilot fly to Saudi Arabia.

See also 
 Transport in Qatar
 List of airports in Qatar
 Old Airport (Doha), the district near the airport

References

External links 

 
 
 

Airports disestablished in 2014
Airports in Qatar
Transport in Doha
Airports established in 1959
1959 establishments in Qatar